The Japanese house bat or Japanese pipistrelle (Pipistrellus abramus) is a species of vesper bat. It prefers to roost under the ceiling or inside the roof of old buildings. It is found across East Asia, from China and Taiwan into the Ussuri region, the Korean Peninsula, and Japan.

Further distribution
In China, it is found in Hainan province and its island and the Zhoushan archipelago.

Diet
The species feeds on beetles, caddisflies, flies, hymenopterans, moths, and true bugs.

Reproduction
Before the young is born, it goes through 33 embryonic stages.

See also
List of mammals in Hong Kong
List of mammals in Korea
List of mammals in Taiwan
List of mammals in Japan

References

External links
Comparison of signals produced by P. abramus and M. mystacinus

Pipistrellus
Bats of Asia
Mammals of East Asia
Mammals of China
Mammals of Japan
Mammals of Korea
Mammals of Russia
Mammals of Taiwan
Mammals of Hong Kong
Taxa named by Coenraad Jacob Temminck
Mammals described in 1840